The 1997 Vuelta a Murcia was the 13th edition of the Vuelta a Murcia cycle race and was held on 5 March to 9 March 1997. The race started and finished in Murcia. The race was won by Juan Carlos Dominguez.

General classification

References

1997
1997 in road cycling
1997 in Spanish sport